Evonne Goolagong defeated Chris Evert in the final, 7–6, 4–6, 6–0 to win the women's singles tennis title at the 1974 Australian Open. It was her first Australian Open title and third major title overall, following three consecutive runner-up finishes at the tournament.

Margaret Court was the reigning champion, but did not compete that year.

Seeds
The seeded players are listed below. Evonne Goolagong is the champion; others show the round in which they were eliminated.

 Chris Evert (finalist)
 Evonne Goolagong (champion)
 Kerry Melville (semifinals)
 Julie Heldman (semifinals)
 Lesley Hunt (quarterfinals)
 Kerry Harris (first round)
 Pam Teeguarden (second round)
 Kazuko Sawamatsu (third round)

Draw

Key
 Q = Qualifier
 WC = Wild card
 LL = Lucky loser
 r = Retired

Finals

Earlier rounds

Section 1

Section 2

Section 3

Section 4

References

External links
 1974 Australian Open – Women's draws and results at the International Tennis Federation

Women's singles
Australian Open (tennis) by year – Women's singles
1973 in Australian women's sport
1974 in Australian women's sport
1974 WTA Tour